Adria Engel Raines (born December 21, 1979) is an American former professional tennis player.

Born in Chicago, Engel is of Czech heritage through both of her parents, who were noted sportspeople in their native Czechoslovakia. Her mother played tennis and trained with Věra Suková, while her father was a professional soccer player. She also has an elder brother, Marty, who played some professional tennis.

Engel was a member of the Arizona State Sun Devils (ASU) varsity tennis team and amassed an ASU record 132 career-singles wins. In 2001, as a sophomore, she became the first player from ASU to claim a Pac-10 singles title.

ITF finals

Singles: 6 (2–4)

Doubles: 9 (3–6)

References

External links
 
 

1979 births
Living people
American female tennis players
Arizona State Sun Devils women's tennis players
Tennis players from Chicago
American people of Czech descent
21st-century American women